Kokotau is a rural locality and a statistical area in the Carterton District and Wellington Region of New Zealand's North Island. The locality is about 8 km southeast of Carterton by road, and the statistical area covers the district east of Carterton to the Ruamahanga and Waingawa rivers.

There was a bridge over the Ruamahanga at Kokotau in 1885. A new bridge was opened in 1892, but was damaged by floods the following year, and again in 1897. The timber truss bridge was replaced by the current concrete pier and girder bridge in 1930.

Kokotau School flourished in 1898.

Demographics 

Kokotau had a population of 1,221 at the 2018 New Zealand census, an increase of 72 people (6.3%) since the 2013 census, and an increase of 312 people (34.3%) since the 2006 census. There were 429 households. There were 636 males and 585 females, giving a sex ratio of 1.09 males per female. The median age was 42.4 years (compared with 37.4 years nationally), with 252 people (20.6%) aged under 15 years, 207 (17.0%) aged 15 to 29, 555 (45.5%) aged 30 to 64, and 204 (16.7%) aged 65 or older.

Ethnicities were 95.1% European/Pākehā, 9.6% Māori, 1.0% Pacific peoples, 0.7% Asian, and 2.5% other ethnicities (totals add to more than 100% since people could identify with multiple ethnicities).

The proportion of people born overseas was 16.5%, compared with 27.1% nationally.

Although some people objected to giving their religion, 54.5% had no religion, 36.9% were Christian, 0.2% were Hindu, 0.2% were Buddhist and 1.0% had other religions.

Of those at least 15 years old, 198 (20.4%) people had a bachelor or higher degree, and 174 (18.0%) people had no formal qualifications. The median income was $33,400, compared with $31,800 nationally. The employment status of those at least 15 was that 486 (50.2%) people were employed full-time, 201 (20.7%) were part-time, and 24 (2.5%) were unemployed.

References

Carterton District
Populated places in the Wellington Region